The 1933 Saint Louis Billikens football team was an American football team that represented Saint Louis University as an independent during the 1933 college football season. In its fourth and final season under head coach Chile Walsh, the team compiled a 6–3 record and outscored opponents by a total of 129 to 77. Having beaten Missouri, and Washington University, the team was declared the Missouri state champion.  Home games were played at Walsh Stadium in St. Louis.

Schedule

References

Saint Louis
Saint Louis Billikens football seasons
Saint Louis Billikens football